Ronaldo V-Football, known as Ronaldo V-Soccer in the United States, is a video game developed by PAM Development and published by Infogrames. It was originally released in 2000 for the PlayStation and Game Boy Color. The game was endorsed by the Brazilian footballer Ronaldo, at the time one of the highest-renowned players in the world. It is the only game exclusively endorsed by him.

Teams

America

Europe

Africa

Asia and Oceania

Bonus Teams
 African All-Stars
 Asian All-Stars
  Brazilian All-Stars
  European All-Stars

Gameplay

There are 176 international teams (some featuring real player names, others not) are available to play in the five different game modes: Exhibition, Arcade Cup, Resistance, Tournaments and the V-Football Cup (the equivalent of the World Cup in the game). All-star teams are unlocked  as a reward for winning competitions. Fifteen stadiums (some based on real locations) are available to play in, with settings for day and night as well as clear, rainy or foggy weather conditions.

Exhibition Mode
Exhibition mode is a quick match option. This mode allowed up to four players to play via the PlayStation multitap. The Game Boy Color version did not support multiplayer play.

Arcade Cup
The Arcade cup is a 16-team knockout competition where the player can not lose more than three times and has to beat all 16 teams. This game mode does not feature a multiplayer option.

Endurance

Endurance is a five-division challenge where players must beat eight other teams in order to climb to the next rank. Resistance mode is completed when the player reaches the highest point on the final rank.

Tournaments
There are several tournaments in the game, with each one taking place in a different continent. The tournaments are available in both tournament and league models.

 Continental Cup
 Supreme Cup
 Continental League
 Intercontinental League
 Custom Cup
 Custom League

V-Football Cup
The main aim of Ronaldo  V-Football is to win the V-Football Cup. The V-Football Cup is set out in a similar model to the FIFA World Cup; the player has to qualify for the championship by winning a continental championship, place in the top two in their group table, and then reach the final by winning the knockout matches that follow the group stage.

Stadiums

 Sportpark Olympia
 Bundesstadion
 Stadio Azurro
 Conquistador Arena
 Stadio Adriatico
 Yolkstadion
 Nordvallen
 Stadio Costa del Sol
 Cosmos Stadium
 Arena des Champions
 Apollo Coliseum
 Stade de Géants
 Stadio Monumental
 Legendary Park
 Island Ground

Music
The main theme for Ronaldo V-Football was "Samba de Janeiro" by Bellini, a dance remix of "Belo Horizonti" by The Heartists. The Game Boy Color version's soundtrack was created by Alberto Jose González.

Development
Rumors of the game first circulated in 1998.

Reception

Game Boy Advance version development
Scattered through the contents of the Game boy Color version of the game Tintin in Tibet there are file paths demonstrating that a version of Ronaldo V-Football for the Game Boy Advance was being developed by Bit Managers at some moment. The extent to which this version was developed is unknown.

References

2000 video games
Infogrames games
Association football video games
Game Boy Color games
PlayStation (console) games
Video games scored by Alberto Jose González
Video games developed in France
Video games based on real people
Cultural depictions of association football players
Cultural depictions of Portuguese men